Limnocoris lutzi is a species of creeping water bug in the family Naucoridae. It is found in Central America and North America.

Subspecies
These two subspecies belong to the species Limnocoris lutzi:
 Limnocoris lutzi lutzi
 Limnocoris lutzi rivers

References

Further reading

 

Articles created by Qbugbot
Insects described in 1957
Naucoridae